Anna Savva is an actress who has appeared in many British TV shows since 1985.

Anna plays series regular, Lugaretzia, across all four series of Simon Nye's The Durrells in 2016 

She originated the role of Martha in the world-premiere of Howard Brenton's JUDE at The Hampstead Theatre.

She has had roles in Minder, EastEnders, Prime Suspect and Planespotting.

She also helped puppeteer "Audrey II" in Little Shop of Horrors.

References

External links
 

British television actresses
British soap opera actresses
Year of birth missing (living people)
Living people